The 2000 Notre Dame Fighting Irish football team represented the University of Notre Dame in the 2000 NCAA Division I-A football season. The team was coached by Bob Davie and played its home games at Notre Dame Stadium in South Bend, Indiana.

Season overview
After losing ten players to the NFL, the Irish began the 2000 season signing 17 recruits Having to replace two-year starter, Jarious Jackson, Davie chose Arnaz Battle, who looked to have a rough road ahead with the Irish playing four ranked teams in a row to begin the season, including a game against the favorite to win the national championship, Nebraska. Battle, however, did have some help with three veterans named to pre-season award watchlists. The Irish started the season playing the 25th ranked Texas A&M Aggies. With Battle throwing two touchdowns and the defense holding the Aggies to only a field goal in the second half, the Irish won by two touchdowns. Moving into the rankings for the first time since early November 1999, the Irish would next face the top-ranked Cornhuskers. After coming back from being down by two touchdowns, the Irish eventually fell in overtime after they settled for a field goal and Nebraska quarterback, Eric Crouch, ran for the winning touchdown. Despite the loss, and losing Battle indefinitely to a wrist injury that he suffered on the first play of the game, the Irish felt they proved something to the country, and moved up in the rankings to 21st.

The Irish next faced the 13th ranked Purdue Boilermakers, led by Heisman Trophy-hopeful quarterback Drew Brees. The Irish defense held Brees to only 13 completed passes, while Irish backup quarterback Gary Godsey completed 14, and led the team to a last minute win with a Nick Setta field goal. Moving into the top-20 the Irish next went to Michigan State to face the 23rd ranked Spartans. Though the Spartans were led by freshman quarterback Jeff Smoker, he led the team to a win with a 68 yard touchdown pass on a fourth down attempt with a minute remaining in the game. Losing the game, the Irish hadn't won an away game in eight attempts and hadn't beaten the Spartans since 1994. Dropping almost out of the rankings again, the Irish started playing freshman quarterback Matt LoVecchio and began to roll with wins over Stanford and Navy. Going to Morgantown to face the West Virginia Mountaineers, LoVecchio led the Irish with two touchdown passes to Tony Fisher to give the Irish their first road win in two years. With a win over Air Force the next week, their first ever in overtime, the Irish were once again bowl eligible.

Ranked 11th, the Irish continued with wins over Boston College, Rutgers, and their first win at USC since 1992. With a 9–2 record, the Irish got a BCS Bowl bid for the first time ever, with an invitation to the Fiesta Bowl to play the Oregon State Beavers. Getting blown out by the Beavers, the Irish ended the season ranked 15th with a 9–3 record. With the end of the season, Davie was named finalist in two coach of the year awards. In addition, four Irish players were named to All-America Teams, seven players were selected to play in post-season All-Star games, and six players were selected in the 2001 NFL Draft, while another three signed free agent contracts with NFL teams. The season ended on a positive note for Davie who signed a five-year contract extension.

Schedule

Roster

Game summaries

Nebraska

Purdue

vs. Oregon State (Fiesta Bowl)

Source: Box Score

Rankings

References

Notre Dame
Notre Dame Fighting Irish football seasons
Notre Dame Fighting Irish football